Kristen Dawn French (May 10, 1976 – April 19, 1992) was a Canadian teen who was abducted and murdered by Karla Homolka and Paul Bernardo. She was interred at Pleasantview Memorial Gardens, Thorold, Ontario, Canada.

Biography

French was born in 1976. She was a member of a precision ice-skating team which won several medals, and a member of the girls' rowing team at Holy Cross Catholic Secondary School in St. Catharines.

Abduction and murder
On April 16, 1992, as she was walking home from Holy Cross Secondary School, a Catholic school in St. Catharines, French was approached at the entrance of the Grace Lutheran Church parking lot by serial killers Karla Homolka and Paul Bernardo under the pretense of needing directions. While French was assisting Homolka with directions, Bernardo attacked her from behind and forced her into the car at knifepoint. While French was seated in the front seat, Homolka held down her hair in order to keep the abductee in check. The kidnapping was seen by several eyewitnesses. When French went missing it drew immediate attention to her family and friends as she always followed the routine of a fifteen-minute walk from school to her home to feed and walk her dog in time.

The medical examiner's report state she was held in captivity for three days, during which Bernardo and Homolka videotaped themselves torturing and subjecting the 15-year-old to sexual humiliation and degradation while forcing her to drink large amounts of alcohol. They murdered her on April 19, 1992. Her naked body was found in a ditch along No. 1 Sideroad in north Burlington on April 30, 1992.

Aftermath
While French was missing, her classmates, teachers and friends at Holy Cross Secondary School chose the Green Ribbon of Hope as the symbol for their search. French's school community also gave the name to the Green Ribbon of Hope Campaign, a national campaign continued by Child Find Canada, governments, organizations and individuals to raise funds and awareness for missing children.

The Green Ribbon Trail in St. Catharines was named in her honour, and a monument to French's memory stands at the beginning of the trail. The ribbon also gave its name to the Green Ribbon Task Force, the police group tasked with finding Leslie Mahaffy and French's killers, though they later found themselves embroiled in controversy over the role of media in police investigations.

French is remembered for declining cooperation with her abductors in the latter period of her abduction: "Some things are worth dying for". She said to Bernardo: "I don't know how your wife can stand to be around you." On one of the memorials dedicated to her is engraved "Her legacy proves an inspiration."

See also
List of solved missing person cases

References

External links

1990s missing person cases
1992 in Ontario
1992 murders in Canada
April 1992 events in Canada
Child abduction in Canada
Deaths by person in Canada
Formerly missing people
Incidents of violence against girls
Kidnapped Canadian children
Missing person cases in Canada
People murdered in Ontario
Violence against women in Canada